Fidelis von Stotzingen (1 May 1871 – 9 January 1947) was a German Benedictine monk of Beuron Archabbey, the second Abbot of Maria Laach Abbey, and the second Abbot Primate of the Order of St. Benedict and the Benedictine Confederation.

Biography

Wilhelm Freiherr von Stotzingen was born in Steisslingen, Baden, Germany, on 1 May 1871. His parents were Baron Roderich von Stotzingen and Karoline Gräfin (Countess von Rechberg und Rothenlöwen) and he was one of seven children (four sons and three daughters) of ancient Swabian nobility. He completed high school in Würzburg and at the age of nineteen he entered Beuron Archabbey and made his religious profession as a monk on 25 January 1892 receiving the name Fidelis. Initial studies at the Pontificio Ateneo Sant'Anselmo in Rome, Italy, led to his ordination to the Roman Catholic priesthood on 27 September 1897. He would continue his studies at the same institution receiving in 1899 a Dr. Phil in Philosophy & Dr. Theo in Theology.

He then returned to Beuron Archabbey where he would serve as Master of Clerics and a Professor of Dogmatic Theology. On 31 October 1901, he would be elected as the second Abbot of Maria Laach Abbey where he would focus on sending "monks to universities for systematic education; he aimed at fuller education for all his sons and fostered lively scholarly activity and interchange of ideas in his community."

On 13 May 1913, Stotzingen would be elected as Coadjutor Abbot Primate to the ailing Abbot Primate Hildebrand de Hemptinne. At the death of the Hemptinne on 13 August 1913, Stotzingen would become the second Abbot Primate of the Order of St. Benedict and the Benedictine Confederation. As Abbot Primate he resided in Rome, Italy, while also overseeing Sant'Anselmo all'Aventino and promoting the Pontificio Ateneo Sant'Anselmo to the monasteries of the world. Unfortunately, World War I proved problematic, would require Stotzingen to close Sant’Anselmo temporarily on 15 May 1915, and then move to Einsiedeln Abbey in Switzerland where he tried to continue his work as Abbot Primate. This work also involved extensive travel to countries like the US where he would spend ten months visiting abbeys and parishes. In 1919 he would return to Sant’Anselmo and begin the work of restoring the institution.

Stotzingen would be reelected in 1925 for another twelve-year term of office, would oversee Sant’Anselmo through the early years of World War II, and would spend considerable time dealing with the ongoing challenges of the Benedictine Order. On 9 January 1947, Stotzingen died at Collegio Sant’Anselmo from the complications of multiple strokes and was buried in the Collegio Sant'Anselmo vault at the Campo Verano Cemetery in Rome, Italy.

See also
 Aus dem Leben des Abt-Primas Fidelis Freiherr von Stotzingen O.S.B by Gertrude von Stotzingen in Hegau: Zeitschrift für Geschichte, Volkskunde und Naturgeschichte des Gebietes zwischen Rhein, Donau und Bodensee 8 (1959) p. 232-237
 Fidelis von Stotzingen: Abt von Maria Laach (1901–1913) und Abtprimas der Benediktinischen Konföderation by Stephan Haering in Laacher Lesebuch St. Ottilien (2006) p. 240–246
 Fidelis von Stotzingen by G. Bartsch in Benediktinische Monatsschrift 23 (1947) p. 18-20
 Fidelis von Stotzingen by B. Neunheuser in Liturgie u. Mönchtum 2 (1948) p 57–63

References

External links
 Maria Laach Abbey (in German)
 Beuron Archabbey (in German)
 The Benedictine Confederation of Congregations of Monasteries of the Order of Saint Benedict (in Italian and English)
 International Atlas of Benedictine Monasteries (in English)
 Pontificio Ateneo Sant'Anselmo (in Italian and English)
 Collegio Sant'Anselmo (in Italian and English)

1891 births
1947 deaths
Abbots Primate
Benedictine scholars
Benedictine writers
20th-century Christian monks
Benedictine abbots
German abbots
German Benedictines